Sarah Jean Pallett is a New Zealand politician and the current  Member of Parliament for Ilam in the House of Representatives for the Labour Party.

Early life and career
Pallett was born in Jersey, Channel Islands and spent her early years in the United Kingdom. Her mother died of breast cancer when Pallett was 21. She came to New Zealand with her husband and two daughters. Since divorced, she was a midwife for 10 years, working as a rural midwife and then at Christchurch Women's Hospital. She became a midwifery lecturer at Ara Institute of Canterbury, and also served as president of the majority union of academic staff at Ara.

Political career

Pallett founded and now chairs the Canterbury Women's Branch of the Labour Party.

Dominic Harris of news website Stuff called it "perhaps the most unlikely of election night coups".

Pallett voted for cannabis reform in the 2020 New Zealand cannabis referendum and for the End of Life Choice Act 2019 to come into force in the 2020 New Zealand euthanasia referendum. Pallett said after her election that she felt it was “really time to move forward” on cannabis leglisation and that the law disproportionately affected Māori and Pasifika. In 2021 she expressed support for a student-led campaign for discounted bus fares in Canterbury.

Pallett is a member of the Health Select Committee.

Personal life
Pallett was diagnosed with breast cancer at the age of 36, but was diagnosed early and survived it stating she is "one of the lucky ones". Pallett lives in Ilam with her husband Andy, whom she married on 9 July 2021 in the halls of parliament. Her son-in-law, Matthew Grace, was her campaign manager.

References

Living people
Members of the New Zealand House of Representatives
Women members of the New Zealand House of Representatives
New Zealand MPs for Christchurch electorates
21st-century New Zealand politicians
21st-century New Zealand women politicians
Jersey expatriates
Jersey emigrants to New Zealand
Candidates in the 2020 New Zealand general election
Year of birth missing (living people)